Clermont Estates Historic District is a national historic district located near Germantown in Columbia County, New York, which was listed on the National Register of Historic Places in 1979. When listed, it included 34 contributing buildings, including the Clermont Manor, which is also a New York State Historic Site.  In 1990, the district was subsumed, along with the Sixteen Mile District, into the Hudson River Historic District.

References

Historic districts on the National Register of Historic Places in New York (state)
Houses on the National Register of Historic Places in New York (state)
Colonial Revival architecture in New York (state)
Renaissance Revival architecture in New York (state)
Historic districts in Columbia County, New York
Houses in Columbia County, New York
National Register of Historic Places in Columbia County, New York